Lone-Lee is a solo album by American jazz saxophonist Lee Konitz recorded in Denmark in 1974 and released on the Danish SteepleChase label. The original LP released in 1975 featured an edited take of "The Song Is You" lasting 19 minutes and the CD release in 1987 featuring the complete unedited take.

Critical reception

Scott Yanow of Allmusic said "This is an unusual release, for it features altoist Lee Konitz playing unaccompanied ... in swinging but relaxed and fairly free fashion. The improvisations are quite thoughtful and logical yet avoid being predictable and hold onto one's interest throughout".

Track listing 
 "The Song Is You" (Jerome Kern, Oscar Hammerstein II) – 38:41 (Edited to 19:25 on LP)	
 "Cherokee" (Ray Noble) – 17:47

Personnel 
Lee Konitz – alto saxophone

References 

Lee Konitz albums
1975 albums
SteepleChase Records albums